Jana Kubala (born 21 August 1966) is an Austrian sports shooter. She competed in two events at the 1992 Summer Olympics.

References

1966 births
Living people
Austrian female sport shooters
Olympic shooters of Austria
Shooters at the 1992 Summer Olympics
Sportspeople from Zlín
20th-century Austrian women